Rodrick Shawn Byrdsong (born October 2, 1979) is a former American football defensive back who played one season with the Baltimore Ravens of the National Football League (NFL). He played college football at Mississippi State University and attended Longview High School in Longview, Texas. He was also a member of the New Orleans Saints.

Professional career
Byrdsong played in one game for the NFL's Baltimore Ravens during the 2002 season. He was released by the Ravens on September 24, 2002. He was signed by the New Orleans Saints of the NFL on February 4, 2003 and allocated to the Berlin Thunder of NFL Europe. Byrdsong was released by the Thunder on March 23, 2003.

References

External links
Just Sports Stats
College stats

Living people
1979 births
Players of American football from Texas
American football defensive backs
African-American players of American football
Mississippi State Bulldogs football players
Baltimore Ravens players
New Orleans Saints players
Berlin Thunder players
People from Longview, Texas
21st-century African-American sportspeople
20th-century African-American sportspeople